Pan Africanist Youth Congress (PAYCO) is the youth wing of the Pan Africanist Congress (PAC) in South Africa. Eastern Cape Launched the first PAYCO Regional Congress under the RTT Leadership led by Comrade Luvo Nkwenkwe.

History 
Founded in 1981, PAYCO (known as AZANYU, at that time), held its first congress in 1986.

Up until 1997 it was known as AZANYU (Azanian Youth Unity).

Notable past presidents of PAYCO include Linda Ndebele (2009), Hulisani Mbara (2007), Sibusiso Xaba (2005), Matome Mashao (2003), Cameron Tabane (1999), Wonder Masombuka (1997), Mosotho Petlane (1993), Ntsie Mohlai, Zingile Mkhabile, Dan Mofokeng (1983) and Arthur Moleko (1981).

African political history
Organisations based in South Africa